George Paul Blagden (born 28 December 1989) is an English stage and film actor. He is best known for his role as Louis XIV in the French-produced television series drama Versailles.  He also played Grantaire in the 2012 film adaptation of Les Misérables and Athelstan in the television series Vikings (2013–2016). He has also narrated the Penguin Classics audiobook version of Homer’s The Odyssey.

Early life and education
Blagden began singing at age 13, performing in various choirs and his own rock band. After studying at Old Buckenham Hall School, he was accepted into Oundle School with a drama scholarship and appeared in the school's Stahl Theatre in such roles as The Baker in Into the Woods and Marc in 'Art'. Also while at Oundle, Blagden became a member of the National Youth Theatre and was selected as one of four students to participate in a masterclass with Sir Ian McKellen. Following his graduation, he studied acting at the Guildhall School of Music and Drama, from which he graduated in 2011. He has a younger sister, Katie, who is a writer and filmmaker.

Career
In 2011, Blagden received his first acting role as Andy in the feature film After the Dark, which was released in 2014. He has since appeared in Wrath of the Titans, Les Misérables, Vikings, and as the lead character Louis XIV in the drama series Versailles.

Blagden played the role of PJ in the 2018 revival of Stephen Sondheim's musical comedy, Company, at the Gielgud Theatre in the West End of London.

Blagden co-stars in the upcoming musical film, The Land of Dreams, directed by Nicola Abbatangelo, with shooting underway in October 2019.

Personal life
Blagden married actress Laura Pitt-Pulford on September 29, 2019. The couple have a son, Arlo Peter Blagden born in October 2020.

He is a supporter of Diabetes UK; from 4–6 September 2015, he cycled from London to Paris in under 72 hours and raised nearly £5,000 for the charity.

Filmography

Theatre

Awards

References

External links
 
 
 
 Spotlight

21st-century English male actors
Alumni of the Guildhall School of Music and Drama
People educated at Oundle School
English tenors
1989 births
Living people
English male actors
National Youth Theatre members
21st-century English singers
21st-century British male singers